Progman Cometh Music Festivals were two Canterbury scene music concerts held at the Moore Theatre in Seattle, Washington, USA, in 2002 and 2003.

Progman Cometh 2002

Friday, August 16
 7:00pm Glass (with friends)
 8:30pm Hughscore
 10:00pm Pip Pyle's Bash! – world debut

Saturday, August 17
 1:00pm Hamster Theatre – first performance outside Colorado
 2:15pm Richard Sinclair
 4:00pm Phreeworld
 6:30pm Kopecky
 8:00pm Richard Sinclair and David Rees-Williams
 9:30pm Soft Works – world debut

Sunday, August 18
 2:00pm Stinkhorn
 3:00pm David Rees-Williams
 4:30pm Azigza
 7:00pm Phil Miller's In Cahoots
 8:30pm Daevid Allen's University of Errors (with Kevin Ayers)
 10:00pm All Star Jam (everyone who is still in town and has any energy left)

Notes
Gordon Beck was scheduled to appear but had to cancel at the last minute due to illness. Akinetón Retard (from Chile) were also scheduled but were prevented from leaving Chile by customs. The "friends" appearing with Glass were William Kopecky, Joe Kopecky and Elton Dean. Soft Works (billed as "Software" before their name change) consisted of Hugh Hopper, Allan Holdsworth, Elton Dean and John Marshall.

Releases
 Hamster Theatre's performance was later released on their double-CD The Public Execution of Mister Personality / Quasi Day Room: Live at the Moore Theatre
 Two songs from the performance of Pip Pyle's Bash were released on Pip's CD Belle Illusion
 The performance by Glass was released as Glass Live At Progman Cometh
 Highlights from the 2002 festival were released as Canterburied in Seattle 2002 on Glass's Bandcamp page
 The entire 2003 festival (less Procol Harum and Alan Parsons) was released on Glass's Bandcamp page

Progman Cometh 2003

Saturday, August 2
 5:00pm Two Monkey Finger (Two Monkey Finger consisted of different musicians for different songs—see below)
 9:00pm The Alan Parsons Project

Two Monkey Finger Set #1

Sunday, August 3
 5:00pm Two Monkey Finger
 7:30pm Steve Smith / Michael Zilber Quartet
 9:30pm Procol Harum

Two Monkey Finger Set #2

External links
 2003 Festival announcement
 Review of 2002 Festival
 2002 Festival highlights
2003 Festival (complete)

References

Music festivals in Washington (state)
Canterbury scene
Rock festivals in the United States